The University of Texas MD Anderson Cancer Center (colloquially MD Anderson Cancer Center) is a comprehensive cancer center in Houston, Texas.  It is the largest cancer center in the U.S. and one of the original three comprehensive cancer centers in the country. It is both a degree-granting academic institution and a cancer treatment and research center located at the Texas Medical Center in Houston. It is affiliated with The University of Texas Health Science Center at Houston. According to Newsweek, MD Anderson Cancer Center is considered the best hospital in the world for oncology and related cancer treatment.

History
The cancer center is named after Monroe Dunaway Anderson, a banker and cotton trader from Jackson, Tennessee. He was a member of a business partnership with his brother-in-law Will Clayton. Their company became the largest cotton company in the world. Anderson feared that in the event of one of the partners' deaths, the company would lose a large amount of money to estate tax and be forced to dissolve. To avoid this, Anderson created the MD Anderson Foundation with an initial sum of $300,000. In 1939 after Anderson's death, the foundation received $19 million.

In 1941 the Texas Legislature had appropriated $500,000 to build a cancer hospital and research center. The Anderson Foundation agreed to match funds with the state if the hospital were located in Houston in the Texas Medical Center (another project of the Anderson Foundation) and named after Anderson.

Using surplus World War II Army barracks, the hospital operated for 10 years from a converted residence and 46 beds leased in a Houston hospital before moving to its current location in 1954.

The institution became the subject of controversy in 2005 when it leased the use of its name to private investors who intended to promote a particular therapeutic approach, proton therapy.  An article in the Houston Chronicle suggested that the arrangement between the center and the investors might skew incentives, providing M.D. Anderson with non-medical reasons to "send as many patients as possible into the program."

Organization

Status
Being part of The University of Texas System, MD Anderson Cancer Center is managed under a nonprofit structure; however, for-profit agreements have caused some to question the motives of the center.

MD Anderson enjoys university status by providing fellowship, internship and residency opportunities to Ph.D.s and medical professionals. The institution offers master's degrees, Ph.D.s and dual M.D./Ph.D. degrees to students enrolled in The University of Texas MD Anderson Cancer Center UTHealth Houston Graduate School of Biomedical Sciences formerly The University of Texas Graduate School of Biomedical Sciences at Houston (UT-GSBS), which it operates with UT Health Science Center at Houston. Areas of study include: Biochemistry & Cell Biology, Cancer Biology, Genetics & Epigenetics, Immunology, Medical Physics, Microbiology & Infectious Diseases, Neuroscience, Quantitative Sciences, and Therapeutics & Pharmacology. Additionally, the institution offers bachelor's and master's degrees to students enrolled in The UT MD Anderson Cancer Center School of Health Professions. Areas of study include clinical laboratory science, cytogenetic technology, cytotechnology, diagnostic imaging, diagnostic medical sonography, healthcare disparities, diversity and advocacy, histotechnology, medical dosimetry, molecular genetic technology, diagnostic genetics, radiological sciences and radiation therapy.

Recognition
In addition to its No. 1 ranking in cancer care by U.S. News & World Report, the cancer center ranks first in the number of National Cancer Institute grants and invested more than $862.8 million in research in FY 2018. The cancer center also has received Magnet Nursing recognition from the American Nurses Credentialing Center.

In May 1996, the Pan American Health Organization (PAHO/WHO) established the Collaborating Center for Supportive Cancer Care at the Pain Research Group, The University of Texas M. D. Anderson Cancer Center. The terms of reference engage the Anderson Center in the development of palliative care programs throughout Latin America and the Caribbean.

Presidents
MD Anderson has had five full-time presidents in its history:
R. Lee Clark, M.D. (1946–1978)
Charles LeMaistre, M.D. (1978–1996)
John Mendelsohn, M.D. (1996–2011)
Ronald DePinho, M.D. (2011–2017)
Peter WT Pisters, M.D. (2017–present)

Mendelsohn stepped down from his position on Sept. 1, 2011, when Ronald A. DePinho, M.D., became president. Mendelsohn remained on the faculty as co-director of the new Sheikh Khalifa Bin Zayed Al Nahyan Institute for Personalized Cancer Therapy. Mendelsohn died on January 7, 2019, from glioblastoma.

Growth

United States growth 
The cancer center continues to grow, increasing in size by 50% in the past 10 years. Presently, the Houston complex now includes more than 680 inpatient beds, several research buildings and outpatient clinic buildings, two faculty office buildings, and a patient-family hotel in addition to other off-site facilities for clinical and research use.

Recently completed construction projects include two new research buildings on MD Anderson's South Campus and the addition of nine floors that can accommodate more than 300 new inpatient beds in Alkek Hospital on the North Campus.

MD Anderson's first facility on its Mid Campus opened in 2011 and includes a 25-story building to support current office space and future growth needs.

Also in 2011, the Khalifa Bin Zayed Al Nahyan Foundation gave $150 million to MD Anderson. The new Sheikh Khalifa Bin Zayed Al Nahyan Building for Personalized Cancer Care is an international center of clinical excellence focusing on using the latest advances in genetic information to develop safe, more effective treatments for patients on a case-by-case basis.

In 2012 the Houston Main Building (originally the Prudential Building) was demolished, with plans to redevelop the site. The building had originally been purchased by MD Anderson in 1974 for $18.5 million.

Locations

Texas Medical Center 

MD Anderson Cancer Center is located at the Texas Medical Center in Houston. The Texas Medical Center is the largest medical center in the world with one of the highest densities of clinical facilities for patient care, basic science, and translational research.

The MD Anderson campus is divided into the North Campus, Mid Campus and South Campus. The North Campus includes: The Main Building, which comprises Alkek Hospital, Bates-Freeman Building, Clark Clinic, Gimbel Building, Jones Research Building, LeMaistre Clinic, Love Clinic and Lutheran Hospital Pavilion. Other facilities on this campus are the Dan L. Duncan Building, Clinical Research Building, Faculty Center, Mays Clinic, Mitchell Basic Sciences Research Building, Pickens Academic Tower, Radiology Outpatient Center and Rotary House International. The T. Boone Pickens Academic Tower, a 21-story,  building, which opened in 2008, is named after T. Boone Pickens, who donated to the cancer center. It houses classrooms, conference facilities, and executive and faculty offices.

The South Campus is home to the McCombs Institute for the Early Detection and Treatment of Cancer, which includes seven translational research centers focused on genomics, proteomics, screening, diagnostic imaging and drug development.

The Mid Campus building, a 25-story building to support current office space and future growth needs, opened in 2011.

MD Anderson Children's Cancer Hospital 
MD Anderson Children's Cancer Hospital is the pediatric unit of the MD Anderson Cancer Center system. The hospital treats infants, children, teens, and young adults even up to age 29 through their AYA cancer program. MD Anderson Children's Cancer Hospital is located on the 9th floor of the main building at the Texas Medical Center campus.

Other locations
MD Anderson operates several other locations within the Houston area. They include:

MD Anderson League City, on the University of Texas Medical Branch League City campus. Specialties include breast cancer, colorectal cancer, dermatology and skin cancer, endocrine cancer, genitourinary cancer, gynecologic cancer, head and neck cancer, neurologic cancer, and thoracic cancer.
MD Anderson Sugar Land, on the campus of St. Luke's Sugar Land Hospital. Specialties include breast cancer, colorectal cancer, dermatology and skin cancer, endocrine cancer, thoracic cancer, neurologic cancer, genitourinary cancer, and gynecologic cancer.
MD Anderson West Houston. Specialties include breast cancer, colorectal cancer, dermatology and skin cancer, endocrine cancer, head and neck cancer, thoracic cancer, neurologic cancer, genitourinary cancer, gynecologic cancer, and urology.
MD Anderson The Woodlands, on the campus of St. Luke's The Woodlands Hospital. Specialties include breast cancer, colorectal cancer, dermatology and skin cancer, endocrine cancer, head and neck cancer, thoracic cancer, neurologic cancer, genitourinary cancer, and gynecologic cancer.
MD Anderson Surgical Clinic Memorial City, on the campus of Memorial Hermann Memorial City Medical Center. This location offers surgical consultation for many types of cancer. It has special expertise in the diagnosis and surgical treatment of breast cancer, gynecologic cancer, thoracic cancer, head and neck cancer, urologic cancer, neurologic cancer, and plastic surgery and reconstruction.
MD Anderson Gynecologic Oncology Clinic in the Texas Medical Center, on the campus of The Woman's Hospital of Texas. This facility specializes in gynecological cancers and treats cervical cancer, fallopian tube cancer, uterine (endometrial) cancer, vaginal cancer, ovarian cancer, vulvar cancer, gynecologic sarcomas, gestational trophoblastic disease, pre-invasive diseases of the lower genital tract, and primary peritoneal cancer.
In September 2018, in collaboration with The University of Texas Medical Branch, the MD Anderson Bay Area location moved to a newly built facility in League City, Texas.

MD Anderson also has operations outside of Texas. 
The MD Anderson Radiation Treatment Center at Presbyterian Kaseman Hospital is located in the Presbyterian Kaseman Hospital in Albuquerque, New Mexico. 
Banner MD Anderson Cancer Center in Gilbert, a city in the Greater Phoenix area of Arizona, opened in September 2011. 
MD Anderson Cancer Center at Cooper, located in Camden, New Jersey, opened in October 2013. 
Baptist MD Anderson Cancer Center in Jacksonville, Florida, opened in October 2015.
The Scripps MD Anderson Cancer Center opened in San Diego, California in 2018.
The MD Anderson Radiation Treatment Center in Istanbul at American Hospital is located in the Vehbi Koc Foundation (VKF) American Hospital in Istanbul, Turkey.
Banner MD Anderson Cancer Center at North Colorado Medical Center in Greeley, Colorado, opened 2018.

Sister institutions
MD Anderson has formed sister institution relationships with more than 25 organizations in Asia, Europe, Central America and South America through its Global Academic Programs department. Collaborations focus on research, prevention, education and patient care.

MD Anderson Services Corporation
MD Anderson Services Corporation (formerly MD Anderson Cancer Center
Outreach Corporation) was established in 1989 as a not-for-profit corporation to enhance revenues of The University of Texas MD Anderson Cancer Center by establishing joint ventures in selected markets, providing additional referrals to the institution, contracting for delivery of inpatient and out-patient management, using existing UT MD Anderson Cancer Center reference laboratory services, and fostering additional philanthropy in distant areas.

See also

 Memorial Sloan Kettering Cancer Center
 Children's Art Project at The University of Texas MD Anderson Cancer Center
 James L. Abbruzzese
 Leon Dmochowski
 Stephen Hahn
 John McGinness
 Eleanor Montague
 Radhe Mohan
 James P. Allison

References

External links

 Official website

 
Cancer hospitals
Hospital buildings completed in 1954
Institutions in the Texas Medical Center
NCI-designated cancer centers
Teaching hospitals in Texas
Universities and colleges accredited by the Southern Association of Colleges and Schools
University of Texas System campuses